Lutz Körner is a former East German slalom canoeist who competed in the 1970s. He won a gold medal in the K-1 team event at the 1977 ICF Canoe Slalom World Championships in Spittal.

References

External links 
 Lutz KÖRNER at CanoeSlalom.net

German male canoeists
Possibly living people
Year of birth missing (living people)
Medalists at the ICF Canoe Slalom World Championships